Brandon Elliot "B. J." Boston Jr. (born November 28, 2001) is an American professional basketball player for the Los Angeles Clippers of the National Basketball Association (NBA). He played college basketball for the Kentucky Wildcats.

High school career
Boston originally attended Norcross High School in Norcross, Georgia before transferring to Sierra Canyon School in the Los Angeles neighborhood of Chatsworth in 2019. He played alongside LeBron James' son Bronny James and Dwyane Wade's son Zaire Wade. In his final season at Norcross, he averaged 18.4 points and 5.4 rebounds per game.

He was selected to play in the 2020 McDonald's All-American Boys Game. He was also selected to play in the 2020 Jordan Brand Classic.

Recruiting
A five-star recruit, Boston committed to play college basketball at the University of Kentucky.

College career
In his college debut on November 25, 2020, Boston posted 15 points and seven rebounds in an 81–45 win over Morehead State. He scored 21 points in the season finale win against South Carolina. As a freshman, he averaged 11.5 points and 4.5 rebounds per game. On March 20, 2021, Boston declared for the 2021 NBA draft, forgoing his remaining college eligibility.

Professional career

Los Angeles Clippers (2021–present)
Boston was selected in the second round of the 2021 NBA draft with the 51st pick by the Memphis Grizzlies, then traded to the Los Angeles Clippers via the New Orleans Pelicans.

Boston was assigned to the Clippers' NBA G League affiliate, the Agua Caliente Clippers, for their G League season opener. Boston helped the Ontario Clippers win the G League Winter Showcase championship in 2022, earning Showcase Cup MVP honors after scoring 21 points in the final.

Career statistics

NBA

|-
| style="text-align:left;"| 
| style="text-align:left;"| L.A. Clippers
| 51 || 0 || 14.9 || .385 || .306 || .819 || 2.2 || 1.0 || .5 || .3 || 6.7
|- class="sortbottom"
| style="text-align:center;" colspan="2"| Career
| 51 || 0 || 14.9 || .385 || .306 || .819 || 2.2 || 1.0 || .5 || .3 || 6.7

College

|-
| style="text-align:left;"| 2020–21
| style="text-align:left;"| Kentucky
| 25 || 24 || 30.3 || .355 || .300 || .785 || 4.5 || 1.6 || 1.3 || .2 || 11.5

Personal life
After a workout with Kentucky teammate Terrence Clarke on April 22, 2021, Clarke was involved in a car crash in Los Angeles, California. Clarke, driving by himself, was killed while Boston, in the car behind of Clarke, witnessed the crash with his father and Clarke's mother.

He also keeps a dollar bill in his shoe during games.

References

External links
Kentucky Wildcats bio
Sierra Canyon Trailblazers bio
USA Basketball bio

2001 births
Living people
Agua Caliente Clippers players
American men's basketball players
Basketball players from Georgia (U.S. state)
Kentucky Wildcats men's basketball players
Los Angeles Clippers players
McDonald's High School All-Americans
Memphis Grizzlies draft picks
People from Norcross, Georgia
Shooting guards
Sierra Canyon School alumni
Sportspeople from the Atlanta metropolitan area